Kathryn Harrold (born August 2, 1950) is an American counselor and retired actress, best known for her leading roles in films The Hunter (1980), Modern Romance (1981), The Pursuit of D. B. Cooper (1981), Yes, Giorgio (1982), and Raw Deal (1986). She had leading roles in horror films Nightwing (1979) and The Sender (1982). She also played Francine Sanders in HBO's The Larry Sanders Show.

Early life
Harrold was born in Tazewell, Virginia, to B.H. and Carolyn Harrold. She attended Tazewell High School and Mills College in Oakland, California, majoring in drama. She studied acting at HB Studio in New York City.

Career

Films
Harrold was Steve McQueen's leading lady in the screen legend's final film, The Hunter (1980), and Arnold Schwarzenegger's leading lady in the action vehicle Raw Deal (1986). She appeared in Nightwing (1979), The Pursuit of D. B. Cooper (1981), the cult horror film The Sender (1982), and co-starred with Luciano Pavarotti in Yes, Giorgio (1982). Harrold starred in Modern Romance (1981) as the ex-girlfriend of Albert Brooks' character. Harrold also had a supporting role in Into the Night (1985), an action/suspense film directed by John Landis, as Paul Mazursky's character's girlfriend.

Television
Harrold began her television career playing Nola Dancy Aldrich on the NBC daytime soap opera The Doctors from 1976 to 1977. After she left the show, her replacement was Kathleen Turner. In 1978-9 she appeared in several episodes of The Rockford Files, as a blind psychiatrist with whom Rockford was in love. In the 1980s, she had the leading roles in the short-lived dramas MacGruder and Loud (1985), produced by Aaron Spelling, and The Bronx Zoo (1987–88), opposite Ed Asner. From 1991 to 1993, she co-starred alongside Regina Taylor and Sam Waterston in the NBC period drama I'll Fly Away. She later was a regular cast member on The Larry Sanders Show, playing Francine Sanders.

During her career, she appeared in several made-for-television movies, most notably Women in White (1979); Vampire (1979); and Bogie (1980), in which she played movie legend Lauren Bacall, reportedly against Bacall's wishes, and the HBO film Dead Solid Perfect (1988) in a leading role opposite Randy Quaid. She also starred in Man Against the Mob (1988) with George Peppard, aired on NBC as a TV movie. In the late 1990s, she had a recurring role in the CBS medical drama Chicago Hope and the following years guest-starred on The Practice, Judging Amy, CSI: NY, and Desperate Housewives.

Personal life
On February 14, 1994, Harrold married Lawrence O'Donnell. The couple had one child, Elizabeth, and eventually divorced in 2013. Harrold retrained as a Licensed Marriage and Family Therapist (LMFT) and now runs her own counseling practice in Los Angeles, California.

Filmography

Film

Television

References

External links

Kathryn Harrold(Aveleyman)

American film actresses
American television actresses
Actresses from Virginia
Living people
People from Tazewell, Virginia
Mills College alumni
20th-century American actresses
21st-century American actresses
1950 births